Kim Ji-hoon (born 9 January 2000), also known as Ji Hun is a South Korean singer and actor. He began his career as a child actor, and more recently starred in the 2013 teen soap opera Melody of Love. He was active as a member of TRCNG until the group's disbandment in 2022.  He re-debuted as a member and leader of BXB on January 30, 2023.

Filmography

Television series
 True Story Red Eye (Y-Star, 2007) – young Dong-yeop
 꾸러기 탐구생활 (SBS, 2010)
 Dong Yi (MBC, 2010) – child of an aristocrat
 The Unlimited Show (season 1) (Tooniverse, 2011) – Joon-seok
 Glory Jane (KBS2, 2011) – young Seo In-woo
 Five Fingers (SBS, 2012) – young Yoo In-ha
 Ohlala Couple (KBS2, 2012) – young Jang Hyun-woo
 Samsaengi (KBS2, 2013) – young Park Dong-woo
 The Queen's Classroom (MBC, 2013) – Kim Tae-sung
 Melody of Love (KBS1, 2013) – Kim Sung-hoon
 Doctor Stranger (SBS, 2014) – young Lee Sung-hoon

Film
 Flashback (2008) – young Young-soo
 How to Live on Earth (2009) – Hoon
 House Family (short film, 2009) – son
 Bad Education (short film, 2010)
 Ghost Sweepers (2012) – Il-kwang
 Zambezia (animated, 2012) – Kai the Peregrine Falcon (Korean dubbing)
 4:44 Seconds (TBA)

Web series

References

External links
 
 Kim Ji-hoon at Daum 

2000 births
Living people
South Korean male film actors
South Korean male television actors
South Korean male child actors
People from Daegu
21st-century South Korean male actors
School of Performing Arts Seoul alumni

South Korean male idols